The Tobruk Ferry Service (also known as the Tobruk Ferry Run) was the name given to the force of Royal Navy and Royal Australian Navy ships involved in the supply of Allied forces during the Siege of Tobruk.

History 
The aim of the Ferry Service was to keep the besieged Allied forces supplied with ammunition, gun barrels, and medical supplies, while evacuating wounded personnel.

The initial supply runs to Tobruk were performed by the ships of the 10th Destroyer Flotilla (which included the Australian 'Scrap Iron Flotilla') operating independently. A typical run saw a destroyer leave Alexandria early in the morning, after spending the night loading, then sail for Tobruk, where the ship would arrive around midnight. After supplies were unloaded and wounded loaded, the destroyer would sail for Mersa Matruh, where the wounded were exchanged for more supplies. The destroyer would return to Tobruk for a second evening, then head back to Alexandria. The danger of attack by air and sea prompted the admiral at Alexandria, after advice from one of the destroyer captains, to send ships in pairs: they could help protect each other, and if one were disabled or sunk, the second could provide assistance or recover survivors.

Losses 
During the operation of the Ferry Service, two destroyers, three sloops, and nineteen smaller vessels were lost. The ships lost included:

 , destroyer
 , destroyer
 , sloop 
 , sloop
 , gunboat
 , cruiser minelayer

See also
 Alfred Brian Palmer

References

External links
Libya- "The Tobruk Ferry Service" at gunplot.net

Libya in World War II
Western Desert campaign
Military operations of World War II involving Australia
Naval battles and operations of World War II involving the United Kingdom